Mitch Brown, Mitchell Brown or Mitchel Brown may refer to:

Mitch Brown (rugby league) (born 1987), Australian rugby league player 
Mitch Brown (snowboarder) (born 1987), New Zealand Olympic snowboarder 
Mitchell Brown (rugby union) (born 1993), New Zealand rugby union player
Two Australian rules footballers:
Mitch Brown (footballer, born 1988), player with the West Coast Eagles 
Mitch Brown (footballer, born 1990), player with Melbourne
Mitchel Brown (born 1981), Honduran footballer